Chrysobothris ephedrae is a species of metallic wood-boring beetle in the family Buprestidae. It is found in North America.

Subspecies
These two subspecies belong to the species Chrysobothris ephedrae:
 Chrysobothris ephedrae ephedrae Knull, 1942
 Chrysobothris ephedrae vogti Knull, 1964

References

Further reading

 
 
 

Buprestidae
Articles created by Qbugbot
Beetles described in 1942